Nahr-e Ebn Naser-e Sofla (also Romanized as Nahr-e Ebn Nāṣer-e Soflá; also known as Nahr-e Bennāṣer-e Soflá) is a village in Hoseyni Rural District, in the Central District of Shadegan County, Khuzestan Province, Iran. At the 2006 census, its population was 110, in 16 families.

References 

Populated places in Shadegan County